Slagdijkstermolen is a smock mill in Feinsum, Friesland, the Netherlands which has been restored to working order. The mill is listed as a Rijksmonument, number 24540.

History

Slagdijkstermolen was built in 1864. In 1931, a diesel engine was placed in the mill and a new Archimedes' screw fitted. The sails were removed in 1938, and the cap was removed in 1952.

In the 1980s, plans were made to restore the mill. The Slagdijkstermolen was sold to Stichting De Fryske Mole (English: Frisian Mills Foundation) on 17 December 1985. In 2006-07, the mill was restored with €60,000 being granted by the province of Friesland towards the costs. The new cap was fitted on the mill on 20 September 2007. The restoration incorporated parts from the Cammingha-Buurstermolen, Leeuwarden which had burnt down. The mill was officially opened in May 2009. The mill forms a pair with the nearby Balkendsterpoldermolen, Oude Leije.

Description

Slagdijkstermolen is what the Dutch describe as an achtkante grondzeiler - a smock mill whose  sails reach almost to the ground. It is a two-storey smock mill on a single-storey base. The mill is winded by tailpole and winch. The smock and cap are thatched. The sails are Common sails. The sails are carried on a cast-iron windshaft. The axle of the Archimedes' screw is 525 millimetres (20¾ inches) diameter and the screw is  diameter. The screw is inclined at 26½°. Each revolution of the screw lifts  of water.

Public access
Slagdijkstermolen is open to the public by appointment.

References

Windmills in Friesland
Windmills completed in 1864
Smock mills in the Netherlands
Windpumps in the Netherlands
Rijksmonuments in Friesland
Octagonal buildings in the Netherlands